Chinese Museum may refer to: 

 Chinese Museum, Melbourne, Australia
 Musée Cernuschi, Paris, France
 Chinese Museum (Fontainebleau), near Paris, France
 Chinese House (Potsdam), near Berlin, Germany

in the United States
 Chinese American Museum, Los Angeles, California
 Chinese Historical Society of America, San Francisco, California
 Chinese American Museum of Chicago, Illinois
 Chinese Museum (Boston), Massachusetts
 Museum of Chinese in America, New York City
 Chinese American Museum DC, Washington, D.C.

See also
 Chinese American Museum (disambiguation)
 List of museums in China